Ethelbert William Bullinger  (15 December 1837 – 6 June 1913) was an Anglican clergyman, biblical scholar, and ultradispensationalist theologian.

Early life
He was born in Canterbury, Kent, England, the youngest of five children of William and Mary (Bent) Bullinger. His family traced their ancestry back to Heinrich Bullinger, the Swiss Reformer.

His formal theological training was at King's College London from 1860 to 1861, and he earned an associate degree. After graduation, on 15 October 1861, he married Emma Dobson, 13 years his senior. He later received a Doctor of Divinity in 1881 not from a university but from Archibald Campbell Tait, Archbishop of Canterbury, who cited Bullinger's "eminent service in the Church in the department of Biblical criticism".

Career
Bullinger's career in the Church of England spanned from 1861 to 1888. He began as associate curate in the parish of St. Mary Magdalene, Bermondsey, in 1861, and was ordained as a priest in the Church of England in 1862. He served as parish curate in Tittleshall (1863–1866), Notting Hill (1866–1869), Leytonstone, (1869–1870) and Walthamstow until he became vicar of the new parish of St. Stephen's in 1874. He resigned his vicarage in 1888.

Trinitarian Bible Society
In the spring of 1867, at the age of 29, Bullinger became clerical secretary of the Trinitarian Bible Society, which he held, with rare lapses for illness in his later years, until his death, in 1913.

The society's accomplishments of TBS during his secretariat include the following:
The completion and publication of a Hebrew version of the New Testament under a TBS contract with Christian David Ginsburg after the demise of Isaac Salkinson.
The publication of Ginsburg's first edition of the Tanakh (Introduction to the Massoretico-Critical Edition of the Hebrew Bible).
The formation (1885) of the Brittany Evangelical Mission Society under Pasteur LeCoat and translation of the Bible into Breton.
The first-ever Protestant Portuguese Reference Bible.
Distribution of Spanish Bibles in Spain after the 1868 Spanish Revolution.

Bullinger and Ginsburg parted ways, and another edition of Tanakh was published by the British and Foreign Bible Society.

Author
Bullinger was editor of a monthly journal Things to Come, subtitled A Journal of Biblical Literature, with Special Reference to Prophetic Truth. The Official Organ of Prophetic Conferences for over 20 years (1894–1915), and he contributed many articles.

In the great Anglican debate of the Victorian era, he belonged to the Low Church, rather than the High Church.

He wrote four major works:
A Critical Lexicon and Concordance to the English and Greek New Testament (1877) 
Number in Scripture (1894) 
Figures of Speech Used in the Bible (1898) 
Primary editor of The Companion Bible (published in 6 parts, 1909–1922) . It was completed after his death by his associates.

As of 2020, those works and many others remain in print, or at least are reproduced on the Internet.

Bullinger was also a practiced musician. As part of his support for the Breton Mission, he collected and harmonized several previously-untranscribed Breton hymns on his visits to Trémel, Brittany. He also published “Fifty original hymn-tunes” in 1874 which reached a third edition in 1897. The first, BULLINGER, is the only still in use today, often sung to the words “I am trusting Thee, Lord Jesus”.

Friends
Bullinger's friends included well-known Zionist Dr. Theodor Herzl. It was a personal friendship, but accorded with Bullinger's belief in a Biblical distinction between the Church and the Jewish people. Another close personal and theological friend was the famous Sir Robert Anderson.

Bullingerism

Bullinger's views were often unique and sometimes controversial. He is so closely tied to what is now called ultradispensationalism that it is sometimes referred to as Bullingerism. Noted dispensationalist Harry A. Ironside (1876–1951) declared Bullingerism an "absolutely Satanic perversion of the truth."
 Bullingerism differed from mainstream dispensationalism on the beginning of the church. Mainstream dispensationalism holds that the Church began at Pentecost, as described early in the Acts of the Apostles. In stark contrast, Bullinger held that the Church, which the Apostle Paul revealed as the Body of Christ, began after the end of Acts, and was not revealed until the Prison Epistles of the Apostle Paul.

Bullinger described dispensations as divine "administrations" or "arrangements" under which God deals at distinct time periods and with distinct groups of people "on distinct principles, and the doctrine relating to each must be kept distinct." He emphasizes, "Nothing but confusion can arise from reading into one dispensation that which relates to another." He lists seven dispensations:

Other views 
Other than ultradispensationalism, Bullinger had many unusual views. For example, Bullinger argued that the death of Jesus occurred on a Wednesday, not a Friday, after Pilate had condemned him at the previous midnight, and that Jesus was crucified on a single upright stake without crossbar with four, not just two, criminals and that this last view was supported by a group of five crosses of different origins (all with crossbar) in Brittany (put together in the 18th century).

Bullinger argued for mortality of the soul, the cessation of the soul between death and resurrection. He did not express any views concerning the final state of the lost, but many of his followers hold to annihilationism.

Bullinger was a supporter of the theory of the Gospel in the Stars, which states the constellations to be pre-Christian expressions of Christian doctrine. In his book Number in Scripture he expounded his belief in the gematria or numerology values of words in Scripture (names and terms), a concept of which the Encyclopædia Britannica says: "Numerology sheds light on the innermost workings of the human mind but very little on the rest of the universe." He strongly opposed the theory of evolution and held that Adam was created in 4004 BC. He was a member of the Universal Zetetic Society, a group dedicated to believing and promoting the idea that the earth is flat, and on 7 March 1905, he chaired a meeting in Exeter Hall, London, in which the flat earth theory was expounded.

Works 
List of works

Number in Scripture
Commentary on Revelation or, The Apocalypse
Word Studies on the Holy Spirit
The Witness of the Stars
How to Enjoy the Bible
The Book of Job, Including "The Oldest Lesson in the World"
The Church Epistles: Romans to Thessalonians
Figures of Speech Used in the Bible
Great Cloud of Witnesses
A Critical Lexicon and Concordance to the English and Greek New Testament
The Companion Bible
The Two Natures in the Child of God
The Foundations of Dispensational Truth
The Chief Musician Or, Studies in the Psalms, and Their Titles
Ten Sermons on the Second Advent
Fifty Original Hymn-Tunes.London: Eyre & Spottiswode (1874)

Notes

References

External links
E.W. Bullinger Biography and Books
https://archive.org/details/witnessofthestar00bulluoft
E.W. Bullinger Books Website
E.W. Bullinger Books online (html & pdf)
Appendixes to The Companion Bible (All 198 appendices to the Bible)
Google has a limited preview of The Companion Bible
The Companion Bible (Condensed) on line
The Companion Bible Notes/Appendices in software module format (not PDF images. Fully searchable)
E.W. Bullinger: Did Jephthah really sacrifice his daughter?
Number in Scripture
E.W. Bullinger: The Christian's Greatest Need
E.W. Bullinger: Number in Scripture Its Supernatural Design and Spiritual Significance (4th Edition, Revised)
E.W. Bullinger: The Rich Man and Lazarus - the Intermediate State
E.W. Bullinger: Great Cloud of Witnesses
E.W. Bullinger: The Two Natures in the Child of God
E.W. Bullinger: The Witness of the Stars
E.W. Bullinger, Critical Lexicon Concordance EngGreek NT. 5thed, (1908).
For more information on Bullinger's dispensationalism go here : E.W. Bullinger's "How to Enjoy the Bible - Rightly Dividing the Word as to its Times and Dispensations" and here : E.W. Bullinger's "How to Enjoy the Bible".

1837 births
1913 deaths
19th-century Anglican theologians
19th-century English Anglican priests
20th-century Anglican theologians
20th-century English Anglican priests
Alumni of King's College London
Associates of King's College London
English Anglican theologians
Evangelical Anglican biblical scholars
Evangelical Anglican clergy
Evangelical Anglican theologians
Flat Earth proponents
People from Canterbury